Peppermint is a Mentha-genus herb.

Peppermint may also refer to:

 Agonis flexuosa, Western Australian peppermint
 Some Eucalyptus species, such as black peppermint or Risdon peppermint
 A mint-flavored variety of hard candy or boiled sweet
 Peppermint (entertainer), American drag queen
 Peppermint (EP), an EP by Sloan
 Peppermint OS, a computer operating system
 Peppermint (1999 film), 1999 Greek film
 Peppermint (2018 film), 2018 American film starring Jennifer Garner